The Boys is the sixth album and first soundtrack album by Australian improvised music trio The Necks originally released on the Wild Sound/MDS label in 1998 and later rereleased on Fish of Milk. The album features music recorded for the Australian motion picture The Boys (1998).

At the ARIA Music Awards of 1998 the soundtrack was nominated for Best Original Soundtrack, Cast or Show Album.

Reception
The All About Jazz review states that "The album would make a good start for those who want to get into these Australians' music, because it's made of smaller doses of the trio's traditional work."

Track listing 
All compositions by The Necks.
 "The Boys I" - 4:28
 "He Led Them into the World" - 10:21
 "Headlights" - 10:11
 "The Boys II" - 3:15
 "The Sleep of Champions" - 6:33
 "Fife and Drum" - 10:22
 "The Boys III" - 3:43

Personnel 
 Chris Abrahams – piano
 Lloyd Swanton – bass
 Tony Buck – drums

References 

The Necks albums
1998 soundtrack albums
Drama film soundtracks